Grigor Grigoryan (born 4 July 1992) is an Armenian freestyle wrestler. He competed at the 70 kg division in the 2014 European Wrestling Championships and won the silver medal.

References

1992 births
Living people
Armenian male sport wrestlers
Wrestlers at the 2015 European Games
European Games competitors for Armenia
European Wrestling Championships medalists
20th-century Armenian people
21st-century Armenian people